Kevin the Bold was an American comic strip that premiered on October 1, 1950, with script and art work by Kreigh Collins. In the 1960s, however, he received script assistance from Jay Heavilin (1961) and Russell R. Winterbotham (1964-68).  This well-written Sunday comic strip was published almost twenty years, telling the story about Kevin as an Irish agent under King Henry VIII of England in the 16th century.

Kevin the Bold (1950–68) was a comic strip whose main character originally appeared as a supporting character in the comic strip Mitzi McCoy, a creation of Collins, which began as a Sunday comic strip on November 7, 1948, launched by the Newspaper Enterprise Association (NEA).

But after less than two years into the strip, on September 24, 1950, one of the characters tells the story of Kevin, a shepherd who saves a medieval ancestor to Mitzi, Moya McCoy. The story begins in 1497, with the landing of Moorish pirates on the Irish coast, in search of slaves. All of a sudden, the following week, the comic strip changed its title to Kevin the Bold, and the supporting character Kevin becomes the main character in what became a historical adventure comic strip.

Kevin, a young Irishman, started out as a simple shepherd, but an unusually handsome and bold one.

In a couple of years he came in contact with King Henry VIII of England. He even performed odd missions as an agent for the king, missions involving daring adventures with young ladies, haughty princesses, brave villains and the like, usually accompanied by the young squire Brett (first appeared on January 20, 1952) and comrade Pedro (who debuted on August 31, 1958, and continued through the final KTB episode).

The comic strip thus takes place in historic Europe, where the vast majority of Kevin’s exploits took place, but was not quite on par with Prince Valiant. However, the series was well-written with exciting art and lasted for almost two decades until 1968. 

Kevin periodically traveled beyond Europe. He also journeyed to North Africa (Morocco) in 1951 and 1967, and Egypt in 1955; he made several trips to the New World—Hispaniola, 1962 and 1964, Roanoke Colony in Virginia (1965), and finally in 1966, Kevin trekked from Montreal to California. He also made brief stops in Asia—he once washed ashore in Japan (1963), spent time in Istanbul on his way back west from Japan, and one of the final KTB chapters found him in the Philippines.

The Sunday comic strip was created to allow some editing by having a redundant comic box in the half page, not necessary for the story, and which could be removed when editing to the full page tabloid. The strip was also available in third page format.

References

1950 comics debuts
American comic strips
1968 comics endings
Male characters in comics
Drama comics
Comics set in England
Comics characters introduced in 1950
Comics set in the 16th century
Cultural depictions of Henry VIII